Nick Reding (born in St. Louis, Missouri) is an American journalist.
His work has appeared in Harper's Bazaar, Food and Wine, Outside, Fast Company, and Details.

Education
He graduated from Northwestern University with a bachelor's degree in creative writing and English literature, and from New York University with a MFA in Creative Writing, where he was a University Fellow. 
He lives with his wife and son in Saint Louis.

Awards
 2009 Chicago Tribune Heartland Prize
 2010 The Hillman Prize

Works
 The Last Cowboys at the End of the World, Crown Publishers, 2001, 
 Methland: The Death and Life of an American Small Town, Bloomsbury Publishing, 2009,

References

External links
"An Interview With Nick Reding, Author of Methland", Huffington Post, July 20, 2009

American male journalists
Writers from St. Louis
Northwestern University alumni
New York University alumni
Year of birth missing (living people)
Living people